This is a list of French ship Classes of World War II. This includes ship Classes used by the French Third Republic, Vichy France and Free France.The sections of the last are in chronological order with the first ships into service being first and the last ships into service being last.

Due to there being three French factions in World War II I will note beside each class its French users. The abbreviation FTR by a class shows it was in service with the Third French Republic, VF by a class shows it was in service with Vichy France and FF by a class shows it was in service with Free French forces.

Aircraft Carrier 

 French aircraft carrier Béarn- FTR and VF

Seaplane tender 

 French seaplane carrier Commandant Teste- FTR and VF

Battleships 

 Courbet-class battleship- FTR, VF and FF
 Bretagne-class battleship- FTR, VF and FF
 Dunkerque-class battleship- FTR and VF
 Richelieu-class battleship- VF and FF

Cruisers

Heavy cruisers 

 Duquesne-class cruiser- FTR and FF
 Suffren-class cruiser- FTR, VF and FF
 French cruiser Algérie- FTR and VF

Light cruisers 

 Duguay-Trouin-class cruiser- FTR, VF and FF
 French cruiser Jeanne d'Arc (1930)- FTR, VF and FF
 French cruiser Émile Bertin- FTR, VF and FF
 La Galissonnière-class cruiser- FTR, VF and FF

Minelaying cruiser 

 French cruiser Pluton- FTR and VF

Destroyers

Large destroyers 

 Chacal-class destroyer- FTR, VF and FF
 Guépard-class destroyer- FTR and VF
 Aigle-class destroyer-FTR and VF
 Vauquelin-class destroyer- FTR and VF
 Le Fantasque-class destroyer- FTR, VF and FF
 Mogador-class destroyer- FTR and VF

Small destroyers 

 Bourrasque-class destroyer- FTR, VF and FF
 L'Adroit-class destroyer- FTR, VF and FF
 Le Hardi-class destroyer- FTR and VF
 La Melpomène-class torpedo boat- FTR, VF and FF
French destroyer La Combattante (British Hunt Class destroyer)-FF

Submarines 

 Sirène-class submarine (1925)- FTR and VF
 Ariane-class submarine- FTR and VF
 Circé-class submarine (1925)- FTR and VF
 Argonaute-class submarine- FTR, VF and FF
 Orion-class submarine- FTR and FF
 Diane-class submarine (1930)- FTR and VF
Saphir-class submarine (1928)- FTR, VF and FF
Requin-class submarine- FTR, VF and FF
Redoutable-class submarine (1928)- FTR, VF and FF
French submarine Surcouf- FTR and FF
Minerve-class submarine- FTR, VF and FF
Aurore-class submarine- FTR and VF
French submarine Curie (P67)(British U-class submarine)- FF
French submarine Narval (T4)(Captured Italian Acciaio-class submarine)- FF

Avisos/sloops 

 Arabis-class sloop- FTR

 French ship Ville d'Ys- FTR and VF
 Arras-class aviso-FTR,VFandFF
 Bougainville-class aviso- FTR, VF and FF
 Élan-class sloop- FTR, VF and FF
 Chamois-class minesweeping sloop- FTR, VF and FF

Escorteurs/Escorts 

 Flower-class corvette- FF
 River-class frigate- FF
 PC-461-class submarine chaser- FF
 Cannon-class destroyer escort- FF

References

World War II ships of France
Ships